Dušan Mirković (born 12 April 1953) is a Yugoslav weightlifter. He competed in the men's middleweight event at the 1980 Summer Olympics.

References

1953 births
Living people
Yugoslav male weightlifters
Olympic weightlifters of Yugoslavia
Weightlifters at the 1980 Summer Olympics
Place of birth missing (living people)